"Mirrors" is a song recorded by American singer-songwriter Justin Timberlake for his third studio album, The 20/20 Experience (2013). First conceived in 2009, the track was inspired by his relationship with Jessica Biel and the marriage of his grandparents. It is an eight-minute-long mid-tempo progressive soul and R&B ballad. Timberlake wrote and produced the song with Timothy "Timbaland" Mosley and Jerome "J-Roc" Harmon, with additional writing from James Fauntleroy. The accompanying music video, directed by Floria Sigismondi, was released in March 2013 and depicts a tale of two lovers through several decades.

"Mirrors" was issued as the second single from The 20/20 Experience on February 11, 2013. It went on to top the Australian Urban, Bulgarian, European, Lebanese, Polish, South African and United Kingdom singles charts, being Timberlake's fourth number-one single in the UK. It peaked at number two on the Billboard Hot 100 and topped the Mainstream Top 40 in the United States. "Mirrors" was ranked at number six on the Year-End Hot 100 chart. The song was met with positive reviews by critics upon release and received a Grammy Award nomination for Best Pop Solo Performance. Its music video won two MTV Video Music Awards, including Video of the Year. As of 2018, the song has sold over 3.9 million downloads in the US.

Timberlake performed "Mirrors" on television shows including Saturday Night Live and the 2013 MTV Video Music Awards as part of a medley number. It was included on Legends of the Summer Tour and The 20/20 Experience World Tour setlists. The American Society of Composers, Authors and Publishers (ASCAP) recognized it as one of the most performed songs of 2014 and 2015.

Production and writing

"Mirrors" was written and produced by Justin Timberlake, Timothy "Timbaland" Mosley and Jerome "J-Roc" Harmon, with additional writing from James Fauntleroy. During an interview with Billboard magazine, Harmon recalled how the song was conceived in 2009, during the recording sessions for Timbaland's third studio album Shock Value II (2009), "He's [Timberlake] like, 'I'm gonna save this one, and this is gonna go on my album.' We never knew when he was going to put it out – we were like, 'Aw man, you're in movies now!' We could have waited another 10, 15 years. But then he surprised us last year and said he was ready, and he brought ['Mirrors'] over to the project as well."

Although the final version of "Mirrors" is eight minutes long, Harmon stated that the more R&B oriented second half (in contrast with the rock-influenced first half) was made years later and independent of the original track, "We segued each piece to go into another song, so if you were to break it up, that second part of 'Mirrors' is like a song by itself. Once we got all the songs that [Timberlake] knew he wanted on this album, then that's when we began to tie everything together, and the second part just fell in order."

"Mirrors" was engineered by Chris Godbey, with assistance from Alejandro Baima. Timberlake arranged and produced his vocals, which were recorded at Larabee Studios in North Hollywood, California. The song was mixed by Jimmy Douglass, Godbey and Timberlake at Larabee Studios. Harmon provided keyboards for the song, while Elliot Ives played the guitar. The strings in the song were played by Benjamin Wright and The Benjamin Wright Orchestra.

In his book Hindsight (2018) Timberlake elaborated about writing the song for his wife Jessica Biel, "We were living together at the time. We weren't engaged yet. In fact, it was years before I proposed... The video became a dedication to my grandparents. I learned about long-lasting love from them. I know that’s what I have with my wife... She changed me. She changed my life. All of that is in "Mirrors." Not the details. But the way it felt to have my life be touched by her..."

Composition and lyrical interpretation 

"Mirrors" is a mid-tempo progressive soul and R&B ballad with an approximate length of eight minutes and five seconds. It is composed in the key of E major, set in common time and has a moderately slow groove of 77 beats per minute. Timberlake's vocals span from the low note of E3 to the high note of C5. The original mix has an instrumentation of emo power ballad guitar strobes, hand-claps, orchestral flares, electro blips and chipmunk synth chirps accompanied with "vocoder-squawk backing vocals", and the orchestra has a noticeable much-lower volume than the percussion and electric guitars.

Brad Stern of MTV Buzzworthy wrote that it is hugely catchy and contains melodies that have arena-size. Pastes Lauren Martin described it as "Coldplay-does-R&B", while according to Raible, "Mirrors" is a sad answer to Natalie Imbruglia's 1997 single "Torn". Mikael Wood of Los Angeles Times described it as a cross between Timberlake's 2002 single "Cry Me a River" and "November Rain" by Guns N' Roses.

HitFix's Melinda Newman wrote that the melody features layer upon layer of the singer's vocals stacked upon each other. Dolan described Timberlake's singing on the song as "replete with laidback soulfulness, mountain-climbing croon, and falsetto butter." Jason Lipshutz of Billboard stated that aside from the presence of Timbaland's "fantastically cluttered production", the difference between "Mirrors" and "Cry Me a River" is clear: "10 years ago, Timberlake was broken, and now he is whole." The conclusion can be seen in the opening lyrics:

Aren't you somethin' to admire?
Cause your shine is somethin' like a mirror
And I can't help but notice
You reflect in this heart of mine.

"Mirrors" is a "new-age wedding reception song". Lyrically, in the song, Timberlake sings to a lover about "coming to the realization" that she is his "other half". The singer references "taking a break from the relationship": "It was easy coming back to you/ Once I figured it out, you were right here all along," he sings on the chorus. "It's like you're my mirror, my mirror staring back at me/ I couldn't get any bigger/ With anyone else beside of me." Vibe'''s Charley Rogulewski wrote that the strength of the song is in Timberlake's Neo blue-eyed soul delivery of the "catchy" lyrics, "I don't want to lose you now. I'm looking right at the other half of me." In the full-length version, a robot voice repeats the phrase "you are the love of my life" over 35 times.

Release
On February 11, 2013, "Mirrors" was digitally released worldwide as the second single from his album, The 20/20 Experience. Timberlake had announced the release on his Twitter account the previous day.  It was available to buy as either as a stand-alone track or as an "instant-gratification download" when a customer pre-ordered the album. On March 1, it was released in Germany as a CD single, which it also contained the lead single from the album, "Suit & Tie". A radio edit of the single, was released for digital download on March 13 in France, Spain and the United States. On April 16, it was solicited to contemporary hit and rhythmic radio stations in the United States. Additionally, "Mirrors" was sent to adult contemporary radio on April 22 and to urban contemporary radio on May 14.

Critical reception
The song received positive reviews from music critics. Jenna Hally Rubenstein of MTV Buzzworthy commented in a positive review, "Unlike "Suit & Tie"'s sultry and retro vibes, the selfie-taker's new jam reminds us a bit more of Justin's FutureSex/LoveSounds days with layered synths and ridiculously club-ready pop production courtesy of JT's main man Timbaland." 

Scott Shetler of Popcrush gave the single four stars out of five, writing: "The song relies on Timbaland’s familiar handclap-style beats and layers of synths and vocals, which instantly embed their way into your brain ... over a bed of gentle piano twinkling and a distorted Timbaland vocal loop, JT delivers some falsetto crooning and a heavy dose of “oohs” and “aahs.”" 

Another favorable review came from Digital Spy's Robert Copsey, who wrote: "Despite musical shifts in the intervening 11 years and the absence of a cheating girlfriend, [the single] still manages to sound remarkably fresh. "It's like you're my mirror/ My mirror staring back at me," he tells his lover over head-nodding Timbaland beatboxing and grandiose strings, before spilling his guts about how he should never have left them in the first place." 

Emily Exton from VH1 called it "grand and ambitious... It’s an interesting character study and an even more interesting ride, completely changing up the rhythm and arrangement after five minutes," while Idolator staff said, "An eight-minute song doesn’t always materialize into something awesome, but here it actually worked."

However, Marc Hogan of Spin Magazine provided a mixed review, stating "And how does the former 'N Sync singer choose to crown his return to pop prominence but with a pickup line even MxPx wouldn't touch? Backed with music that's a cross between luxe Bruno Mars '80s-grenade balladry and those human beatbox hiccups that, in all honesty, were starting to be played out even when Timberlake tapped Timbaland to use them, brilliantly, on FutureSex/LoveSounds?" Vibes Charley Rogulewski wrote that the singer renders the song more like a pop performer than a R&B, and puts a "wider space between him and the likes of Robin Thicke. This man is making a serious comeback." 

Andy Kellman of Allmusic unfavorably described the song as "less an epic than a drawn-out midtempo pop ballad" and "not one of [Timberlake's] more remarkable singles."

In a monthly mix review published in Sound on Sound, Mike Senior was not positive towards the track, feeling that the live strings used in the track were wasted, and sounded too low of volume compared to the other instruments.

At the end of the year, Rolling Stone listed "Mirrors" at number 7 on its list of 100 Best Songs of 2013 and Billboard editors placed it at number 10 on its 20 Best Songs of 2013.

 Chart performance 

In the US, "Mirrors" debuted at number 24 on the Billboard Hot 100 chart and sold 163,000 copies in its first week. In its third week the song fell to number 97, however it rebound to 77 in its fourth week on the chart. In its sixth week on the chart, the song reached number 13 and for the issue dated June 15, 2013, "Mirrors" reached its peak on the chart at number two, held from the top spot by Macklemore and Ryan Lewis' "Can't Hold Us". 

For the week of June 1, 2013, the single topped the US Mainstream Top 40 chart and tied Timberlake for most number-ones with singer Bruno Mars; each of them has six. The song topped the chart for three consecutive weeks. "Mirrors" also topped the Adult Pop Songs chart and reached number eight on the Adult Contemporary chart. 

Additionally, it spent seven weeks atop Radio Songs. "Mirrors" became the third song to top the Mainstream Top 40, Rhythmic and Adult Pop Songs airplay charts, tying the record held by Mariah Carey & Boyz II Men's "One Sweet Day" (1995–1996) and Ricky Martin's "Livin' La Vida Loca" (1999). It was certified double platinum by the Recording Industry Association of America (RIAA). 

As of 2018, the song has accumulated 5.9 million units in the US, combining sales (3.9 million downloads sold) and equivalent streams. On the Canadian Hot 100, the single reached a peak of number four. "Mirrors" was certified double platinum by Music Canada, selling over 160,000 digital copies in the country.

"Mirrors" debuted at number 28 on the UK Singles Chart on February 23, 2013 and reached number one on March 3, 2013. It became Timberlake's second solo single to top the chart and fourth song overall. The single topped the chart for three consecutive weeks. 

It also reached number on the Scottish Singles Chart and number two on the Irish Singles Chart. "Mirrors" peaked number two on the German Singles Chart and was certified platinum by Bundesverband Musikindustrie (BMVI) for selling over 300,000 digital copies in the country. The single debuted and peaked at number four on the Danish Singles Chart; it stayed on the position for two weeks. IFPI Denmark certified the song platinum for selling over 30,000 copies.

In Switzerland, "Mirrors" peaked at number five on the Swiss Singles Chart and stayed on its peak for four weeks. The song debuted on the Norwegian Singles Chart at number 18. In its fourth week, it reach a peak of number seven and stayed on the position for two consecutive weeks.

The single debuted on the Australian Singles Chart at number 26 on March 24, 2013. After eight weeks on the chart, it reached its peak of number 10 on May 12, 2013. It also reached number one on the Australian Urban Singles Chart. "Mirrors" was certified double platinum by the Australian Recording Industry Association (ARIA) for selling over 140,000 copies in the country. In New Zealand, the song debuted at number 23 on March 4, 2013. After five weeks on the chart, on April 1, 2013, "Mirrors" reached its peak of number seven on the chart and stayed on the position the next week. Recording Industry Association of New Zealand (RIANZ) certified it platinum for selling over 15,000 copies in the country.

In 2013, "Mirrors" was ranked as the sixth-most popular song of the year on the Billboard Hot 100.

 Music video 

The music video was directed by Floria Sigismondi and saw its world premiere as the highlight of an hour-long special on The CW in celebration of The 20/20 Experience's release. Timberlake dedicated the music video to his maternal grandparents William and Sadie Bomar, who were married for 63 years until William's death in 2012. The video is choreographed by Noemie Lafrance.

It features montages of three separate time periods of a couple's life, from their initial introduction and whimsically falling in love on a funhouse date (portrayed by actors Ariane Rinehart and Keenan Cochrane), to the difficult start of their marriage with a pregnancy (portrayed by Chloe Brooks and James Kacey), to when they have grown old together and the old lady (Judith Roberts) packing up her recently deceased husband's belonging whilst reflecting on their life together.

At the beginning, the elderly woman looks back on her teen years in the 1950s when she meets her husband in a bar and goes on a date to a funhouse. Then, in the 1960s, she cries with black mascara all over her face as she is pregnant and they are unmarried. Meanwhile, the elderly woman, who sees the events of her teen years and interspersed with scenes of her and her husband dancing for the last time before they move out, walks into a mysterious room where an old man is seen staring at the real life woman in her white wedding dress next to two mannequin people while rain pours down on the glass. This is probably symbolizing that he always viewed his wife as beautiful as the day they married. She moves through the video while the old man and the elderly woman move walk through separate ways through the video and through the mirrors symbolizing his death and her moving on.

During the final chorus, one of the books the teenaged couple left on the floor of the funhouse falls back into the elderly woman's hand as she closes the book. The old woman is then seen with a ring which is revealed in flashbacks to be her wedding ring, after she married her husband after pregnancy. Her husband looks on and they move through separate areas before the end of the video where the old man and woman walk through three versions of mirrors. The elderly woman drops the ring, showing she is ready to move on after her husband's death. This transitions into Timberlake catching it, symbolizing that he is carrying on their legacy. He then sings "you are the love of my life" while dancing through and around the funhouse mirrors. Eventually he is joined by two female dancers in blue wigs. Justin and one of the other dancers eventually mirror each other's movements through glass at the end of the video.

ReceptionMTV News' James Montgomery reviewed the video, saying:

"It's a clip that packs an emotional wallop, a downright beautiful examination of the ebbs and flows of love and the true connection that continues once our time here is over. That's a rare thing indeed, and so is this video ... it is understated and elegant and really truly touching."

Timberlake's grandmother Sadie Bomar told Italian weekly Grazia that "Justin didn't tell me he was doing it [making the video], it was a surprise. He said, “You have to see this video, just you sit down and watch it". I was moved by it, it brings tears to my eyes. It's a lovely tribute to us."

Timberlake took home the award for Video of the Year at the 2013 MTV Video Music Awards. The video also won the  award for Best Editing. It was named one of the 10 best music videos of the year by The Hollywood Reporter and Spin. Maura Johnston from Spin wrote:

The music video on YouTube has received 1.11 billion views as of February 2023, making it the single second-most popular on Justin Timberlake's channel, just behind Can't Stop the Feeling!, whose video has achieved 1.6 billion views since first published in May 2016.

 Live performances 
"Mirrors" was performed on The Ellen DeGeneres Show and Saturday Night Live. On February 20, 2013, he performed the song at the 2013 Brit Awards. On August 25, 2013, he performed "Mirrors" in a medley with other of his songs at the 2013 MTV Video Music Awards. After the performance he accepted the Michael Jackson Video Vanguard Award at the ceremony.

The song was featured on Justin and Jay-Z's co-headlining Legends of the Summer Tour (2013) and The 20/20 Experience World Tour (2013/15).

Timberlake made a guest appearance on Taylor Swift's 1989 Tour and they performed "Mirrors" together on August 26, 2015.

 Cover versions 
In May 2013, Boyce Avenue released with Fifth Harmony their version of the song. The Huffington Post noted that the duet "makes for the perfect blend of harmonies -- and a convincing love story told through lyrics." The cover was nominated for a YouTube Music Award. In the same month, Issues frontman Tyler Carter released a cover of Mirrors, while replacing the second verse with his own.

In April 2013, Paradise Fears covered this song, with lead vocalist Sam Miller adding his own personal flair to it.

In June 2013, Cimorelli released their version of the song along with Big Time Rush member James Maslow. Amy Sciarretto of Pop Crush noted that the track "gets a boost from an added masculine element. Maslow’s presence adds a whole other layer of harmony, too." In September 2013, Ellie Goulding also sang it in the Live Lounge. Entertainment Weekly wrote that she had added "some piano and a more soulful edge" and that "her vocal riffs give the tune a whole new flavor". Mike Wass of Idolator felt it was not a "bad" performance, but that "her high-pitched vocal is just a little too cutesy for a song that demands a certain amount of soul."

In August 2015, country singer Hunter Hayes performed a bluegrass version of the song at Nashville's famed Blackbird studio for YouTube channel CountryNow. Stephen L. Betts from Rolling Stone gave it a positive review, writing "his performance focuses on a passionately delivered vocal laced with touches of R&B in his voice."

Canadian country group Hunter Brothers recorded a cover of the song that was included on their debut studio album, Getaway, in March 2017.

 Track listings 

CD single
"Mirrors" — 8:05
"Suit & Tie" (Radio Edit) featuring Jay Z — 4:29

Digital download
"Mirrors" — 8:05

Digital download (Radio Edit)
"Mirrors" (Radio Edit) — 4:37

2013 Brit Awards
"Mirrors" (Live from the BRITs) — 5:12

 Credits and personnel 
Credits adapted from the liner notes of The 20/20 Experience''.
Locations
Vocals recorded and mixed at Larrabee Studios, North Hollywood, California
Personnel

Timothy "Timbaland" Mosley – producer, songwriter
Justin Timberlake – Mixer, producer, songwriter, vocal producer, vocal arranger, guitar
Jerome "J-Roc" Harmon – keyboards, producer, songwriter
James Fauntleroy – songwriter
Chris Godbey – engineer, mixer
Jimmy Douglass – mixer
Alejandro Baima – assistant engineer
Elliot Ives – guitar
Benjamin Wright and The Benjamin Wright Orchestra – strings

Awards and nominations

Charts

Weekly charts

Year-end charts

Certifications

Release history

See also 

List of best-selling singles
List of UK Singles Chart number ones of the 2010s

References

External links
 

2010s ballads
2013 singles
2013 songs
Pop ballads
Justin Timberlake songs
Songs written by Timbaland
Songs written by Justin Timberlake
Songs written by Jerome "J-Roc" Harmon
Songs written by James Fauntleroy
Song recordings produced by Timbaland
Song recordings produced by Justin Timberlake
Song recordings produced by Jerome "J-Roc" Harmon
Number-one singles in Israel
Number-one singles in Poland
UK Singles Chart number-one singles
Music videos directed by Floria Sigismondi
MTV Video of the Year Award
Torch songs
Contemporary R&B ballads
RCA Records singles